Wenderholm Regional Park is a regional park north of Auckland in New Zealand's North Island. It is situated between the estuaries of the Puhoi River and the Waiwera River, on the east coast of New Zealand's North Island and features a homestead known as Couldrey House, and a carved pouwhenua.

The park also features the  'Maungatauhoro Te Hikoi' walking track, starting at the carved pouwhenua near the Couldrey House. The track features scenic views and birdlife.

Wenderholm Regional Park was the first regional park established in the Auckland region, and is owned and managed by Auckland Council. Part of the park is sectioned off for ecological restoration.

Geography

A  section of the park has been set aside since 1965 for an ecological experiment, stopping livestock from grazing and repopulating the forests. This allowed native species of birds which were no longer in the area to be re-introduced in 1999. One of the first species released into the area, Petroica australis longipes (North Island robins), has a generally high rate of survival and procreated a good number of young, unfortunately not high enough to compensate for the loss of the adult population.

Whales such as southern right whales may appear to rest and calve along the coasts. Dolphins may be visible from the shores as well.

The native bush of the park is the Pohutukawa, with the blaze of red in the summer, on the slopes facing north is the Kowhai bush which are covered with yellow blooms in the spring, and the low-laying sandspit.

History

For approximately 1,000 years Maori lived in the area now encompassed by the park because it featured several natural resources. It was generally known as Te Awa Puhoi or 'The slow flowing river'. Te Kawerau related tribes lives in the area, settling in locations such as Te Akeake, a kāinga at the mouth of the Puhoi Estuary and Kakaha Pā, a defensive outpost located at the highest point of the peninsula, Maungatauhoro / Wenderholm Hill.

The Auckland politician and entrepreneur Sir Robert Graham protected many of the ancient trees in the area from felling to be used for timber for ships. He went on to build a homestead in the park (now known as the Couldrey House), in the late 1860s. Many of the historic trees in the park were given as gifts to Robert Graham from George Grey. The name Wenderholm was the name given to Graham's residence. 

Graham planted many exotic species of plant at his home, and preserved a 19th century grove of pōhutukawa trees in the 1880s. Graham sold the land, and the homestead became known as the Couldrey House, named for its final owner, H.W. Couldrey.

Wenderholm became the first regional park in the Auckland Region in 1965. 

In 2008, Nic Moon was appointed the park's resident artist. Her role was to create works specifically for the site, including some that involve the trees themselves.

References 

Rodney Local Board Area
Parks in the Auckland Region
Regional parks of New Zealand
Tourist attractions in the Auckland Region